Christopher Walenty Dreja (born 11 November 1945 in Surbiton, Surrey) is an English musician, best known as the rhythm guitarist and bassist for rock band the Yardbirds for which he was inducted into the Rock and Roll Hall of Fame in 1992.

Early life
Chris Dreja was born in Surbiton, and raised in Kingston upon Thames, Surrey. His  father, Alojzy Dreja (1918–1985), was from Poland; he had been exiled to Britain in 1940, and served as a pilot in the Polish Air Force in Great Britain during World War II. Chris Dreja's brother Stefan happened to meet guitarist Top Topham when they studied at the same pre-college art program, and introduced him to his brother. Topham and Dreja were influenced by folk/blues guitarist Gerry Lockran, who influenced them to switch from acoustic to electric guitars according to Greg Russo in his book The Yardbirds: The Ultimate Rave-Up. They made their debut with electric guitars at a concert with Duster Bennett and a young Jimmy Page.

The Yardbirds
Dreja and Topham became core members of  the Metropolitan (or Metropolis) Blues Quartet. During the space of a year Keith Relf, Jim McCarty, and Paul Samwell-Smith joined the group which became the Yardbirds. The 15-year-old Topham left the group when the band went professional, but Dreja continued on to play rhythm guitar with musicians such as Eric Clapton and later Jeff Beck and Jimmy Page.  

Dreja changed from rhythm to bass guitar following the departure of the original bassist, Samwell-Smith. Dreja co-authored many Yardbirds group compositions, especially those on the album Yardbirds. Additionally, he drew the picture which would be used as the album cover. Due to this drawing the album has been referred to as Roger the Engineer. After the group broke up, Page offered Dreja the position of bassist in a new band he was forming (later to become Led Zeppelin).  Dreja declined in order to pursue a profession in photography. He photographed Led Zeppelin for the back cover of their debut album.

Dreja played in the Yardbirds spin-off band Box of Frogs in the 1980s, and had been part of the Yardbirds' reformation from 1992 to 2013.  In 2002, the Yardbirds re-emerged and  a new album, Birdland, was released.

Dreja suffered a series of strokes in 2012 and 2013 and had not performed with the Yardbirds since mid-2012. In July 2013, it was announced that he had officially left the band for medical reasons and was replaced by original lead guitarist Topham.

References

1945 births
Living people
English rock bass guitarists
Male bass guitarists
English rock guitarists
English songwriters
The Yardbirds members
People from Surbiton
English people of Polish descent
Rhythm guitarists
British rhythm and blues boom musicians
Blues rock musicians
Rock songwriters
Led Zeppelin
Box of Frogs members